The men's 1964 United States Olympic trials for track and field were a two-tiered event. Athletes first met for semi-final Olympic trials in Randalls Island, New York, from July 3 to 4. The final trials were held at the Los Angeles Memorial Coliseum, Los Angeles, California, between September 12 and 13. The Colisseum had hosted the Olympics 32 years earlier and would come to host the Olympics a second time 20 years later. The races at Los Angeles were only the finals, selected from the top runners in the semi-final Olympic trials in New York.  The 20 kilometer walk trials were held in Pittsburgh, Pennsylvania, on July 5, and the 50 kilometer walk trials were held on September 5 in Seattle, Washington. Two marathon trials were held, the AAU National Championships in Yonkers, New York, on May 24 selected one entrant, while the Western Hemisphere Marathon in Culver City, California, on July 26 selected two. American resident, but Taiwanese citizen C. K. Yang was allowed to participate in the decathlon, but his dominant performance did not displace the American athletes in the trials. The process was organized by the AAU.

The women's Olympic trials were held separately in Downing Stadium on Randalls Island, New York, between August 6 and 8.

Men's results
Key:
.

Men track events

Men field events

Notes
 Fourth place Henry Carr was selected instead of Hayes based on his superior performance in the Semi-Olympic trials.  Carr went on to win the gold medal.

Women's results

Women track events

Women field events

External links
 Pathe highlights

References

US Olympic Trials
Track, Outdoor
Olympic Trials (track and field)
Olympic Trials (track and field)
United States Summer Olympics Trials